Morrison Hill ( or ) is an area and the location of a hill between Wan Chai and Bowrington, on Hong Kong Island  in Hong Kong.

History
The hill was at the seashore until the Praya East Reclamation Scheme in the 1920s, which used its constituent rock/earth to reclaim land from the harbour, extending the shoreline away from the area. This major operation took most of the decade and to carry away the rock and soil, temporary railway tracks were laid, running along Bowrington Canal (present day Canal Road), 

The hill was named for Protestant missionary and linguist Dr Robert Morrison who travelled through the region as part of the Morrison Education Society.

Features
Today, the centre of the area is occupied by the Morrison Hill Swimming Pool and several secondary schools, within a circular street, Oi Kwan Road. A main road, Morrison Hill Road, runs along the east side of the area. The Queen Elizabeth Stadium and the Tang Shiu Kin Hospital are on its southern fringe. There is also a skatepark near the children's playground to the south-east.

Facilities along Oi Kwan Road
Amenity facilities include:
Queen Elizabeth Stadium
Morrison Hill Swimming Pool

Medical establishments include:
Tang Shiu Kin Hospital
Tang Chi Ngong Specialist Clinic
MacLehose Dental Centre

Educational institutions include:
Hong Kong Institute of Vocational Education (Morrison Hill) (with the headquarters of Vocation Training Council by its side),
Lady Trench Training Centre
Tang Shiu Kin Victoria Government Secondary School
Sheng Kung Hui Tang Shiu Kin Secondary School

Other major facilities include:
The Scout Association of Hong Kong Regional Headquarters
Tang Shiu Kin Social Service Centre
Ammar Mosque and Osman Ramju Sadick Islamic Centre

Residential building includes:
Oi Kwan Court

See also
Khalsa Diwan Sikh Temple
Mount Parish

References